Kotticode is a town in the Kanniyakumari district in the Indian state of Tamil nadu near the southern tip of India.

History
The Panchayat town was once part of the Travancore Kingdom. After the States Reorganisation Act was passed, Kotticode became a part of the state of Tamil Nadu.

Nearby
Kotticode is located at Kalkulam Taluk in the Kanyakumari District of Tamil Nadu. Kotticode is located at about 8 km from Thuckalay, 26 km from Boothapandi, 11 km from Eraniel, 20 km from Nagercoil, 41 km from Kanyakumari and 61 km from Thiruvananthapuram. The nearest railway station is located at Eraniel and the nearest airport is located at Thiruvananthapuram.

References

 https://web.archive.org/web/20040616075334/http://www.censusindia.net/results/town.php?stad=A&state5=999
 http://www.census2011.co.in/data/town/803902-kumarapuram-tamil-nadu.html

Cities and towns in Kanyakumari district